The Best of Testament is the first compilation album by Testament. It was released in 1996 by their former labels Atlantic Records and Megaforce Records, and it contains tracks from their first album The Legacy (1987) to their then-recent album Low (1994). This compilation album has never been released in the United States, and Testament (who had been dropped from Atlantic by this point) had no involvement with it.

Track listing
 "Over the Wall" from The Legacy (1987)
 "The New Order" from The New Order (1988)
 "Sins of Omission" from Practice What You Preach (1989)
 "Electric Crown" from The Ritual (1992)
 "The Legacy" from Souls of Black (1990)
 "Burnt Offerings" from The Legacy (1987)
 "Practice What You Preach" from Practice What You Preach (1989)
 "Hail Mary" from Low (1994)
 "Trial by Fire" from The New Order (1988)
 "Alone in the Dark" from The Legacy (1987)
 "Disciples of the Watch" from The New Order (1988)
 "Greenhouse Effect" from Practice What You Preach (1989)
 "Low" from Low (1994)
 "Souls of Black" from Souls of Black (1990)
 "Return to Serenity" from The Ritual (1992)

References

1996 greatest hits albums
Testament (band) compilation albums
Atlantic Records compilation albums
Megaforce Records compilation albums